Typhoon Joe, known in the Philippines as Typhoon Nitang, affected the Philippines, China, and Vietnam during July 1980. An area of disturbed weather formed near the Caroline Islands on July 14. Shower activity gradually became better organized, and two days later, the system was upgraded into a tropical depression. On July 18, the depression was classified as Tropical Storm Joe. Initially, Joe moved northwest, but began to turn to the west-northwest, anchored by a subtropical ridge to its north. Joe started to deepen at a faster clip, and attained typhoon intensity on July 19. The eye began to clear out, and the next day, Joe reached its highest intensity. Shortly thereafter, Joe moved ashore the Philippines. There, 31 people were killed and 300,000 others were directly affected. Around 5,000 homes were destroyed, resulting in an additional 29,000 homeless. Damage in the nation was estimated at $14.5 million (1980 USD).

The storm weakened rapidly over land, but re-intensified over the open waters of the South China Sea. Joe crossed the Leizhou Peninsula on July 22, where it became the strongest system to hit the peninsula in 26 years. A total of 188 people were killed in the area. Further north, in Hong Kong, two people were killed and 59 were injured. After weakening slightly, Joe made its final landfall in Vietnam while still at typhoon intensity. In Vietnam, 130 people were killed, 300,000 were directly affected, 165,000 lost their homes, 50,000 acres (20,000 ha) of rice paddies were flooded. In addition, 15,800 buildings were destroyed while 16,300 homes were flooded. Inland over Vietnam, Joe dissipated on July 24.

Meteorological history 

An area of disturbed weather developed over the Caroline Islands on July 14. Tracking westward, convective activity gradually increased in both convection and coverage. At 18:00 UTC on July 22, the Japan Meteorological Agency (JMA) started tracking the system. Less than four hours later, the Joint Typhoon Warning Center (JTWC) issued a Tropical Cyclone Formation Alert (TCFA). Initially, the low- and mid-level circulations were not vertically stacked, with the low-level center exposed from the deep convection. By 00:00 UTC on July 17, the surface center and the deep convection moved closer together, prompting the JTWC to classify the system as Tropical Depression 09. Post-season analysis indicated that the depression had actually developed about 24 hours earlier than initially indicated. Meanwhile, the Philippine Atmospheric, Geophysical and Astronomical Services Administration (PAGASA) also monitored the storm and assigned it with the local name Nitang.

The depression began to develop at a quicker pace, and early on July 18, the JTWC upgraded it to a tropical storm. Six hours later, the JMA declared Joe a tropical storm. Joe then began to move on a constant and brisk westward course that it would maintain for the rest of its life in response to an unusually strong subtropical ridge that was east of its climatological position and to the north of the cyclone. After Joe developed a central dense overcast – a large mass of deep convection, the JMA upgraded Joe into a severe tropical storm. At midday, hints of an eye became apparent on satellite imagery, which led to the JTWC and JMA upgrading Joe into a typhoon. An eye began to clear out on July 20.

Six hours after its peak, Joe made landfall in central Luzon. Over land, Joe weakened rapidly, falling to tropical storm strength according to the JTWC. After entering the South China Sea on July 21, the JTWC expected Joe to turn northwest and threaten China. However, this did not occur due to the strong ridge to its north. Joe began to re-intensify; data from the JTWC suggested that Joe regained typhoon intensity almost immediately thereafter. At 00:00 UTC on July 22, the JTWC estimated that Joe attained a secondary peak of  based on a Dvorak classification of T5.0. Despite maintaining its structure as it tracked over the Leizhou Peninsula, the storm weakened as it entered the Gulf of Tonkin and approached the coast of Vietnam. Both the JTWC and JMA agree that Joe had winds of  when it moved ashore near Haiphong in Vietnam later on July 22. A combination of land interaction and vertical wind shear resulted in rapid weakening. At 00:00 UTC on July 23, the JTWC issued its last warning on Joe. The remnants of Joe later moved into Laos. The JMA stopped watching Joe on July 24.

Preparations and impact 

Prior to its first landfall, storm warnings were posted for most of the Philippines. Across the Philippines, 31 citizens were killed, including eight fisherman. There, 300,000 people were directly affected. Around 5,000 homes were destroyed, resulting in an additional 29,000 homeless. Damage totaled $14.5 million. Less than a week later, the same areas were affected by Typhoon Kim.

The typhoon also tracked over the Leizhou Peninsula, becoming the strongest system to affect the region in 26 years. Two large ships, a  liner and a  tanker, were washed ashore in Chankiang. Throughout the area, 188 people were killed and at least 100 others were left homeless. Further north, in Hong Kong, a No 1. hurricane signal was issued early on July 21. Later that day, the signal was increased to a No 3. hurricane signal and then elevated to a No 8. hurricane signal. All signals were dropped late on July 22, after Joe made its closest approach to Hong Kong. HKO observed  of rain over a 72-hour period. Within the vicinity of Hong Kong, two people were killed at a construction site in Kwai Chung. A total of 59 people were injured, including seven that were hospitalized, most from fallen debris. Three boats were also lost at sea after their anchors to the harbor broke. Air and sea traffic came to a halt. Overall, damage in the Hong Kong area was slight.

In Vietnam, 130 people were killed, 300,000 others were directly affected, and 165,000 others lost their homes. An additional 15,800 buildings were destroyed, 16,300 homes were flooded, and many boats sunk. The storm inundated  of rice paddies, uprooted trees, and blew off roofs from houses. It also brought additional flooding to provinces of Ha nam ninh, Ha bac, Hai hung, and Ha son binh; these areas were already inundated by prior flooding.

See also 

Similar early season Philippine typhoons
Typhoon Koryn (1993)
Typhoon Peggy (1986)
Typhoon Vera (1983)

Notes

References

External links

Joe
Joe (1980)
Joe (1980)
J
J
J
J
J
J
Joe